William Harold Coltman,  (17 November 1891 – 29 June 1974) was an English recipient of the Victoria Cross (VC), the highest award for gallantry in the face of the enemy that could be awarded to British and Commonwealth forces. He was the most decorated other rank of the First World War.

Early life
Coltman was born at Rangemore, a village on the outskirts of Burton upon Trent, Staffordshire, and baptised at All Saints, Rangemore on 27 December 1891. He worked as a market gardener. He became a member of the Plymouth Brethren, and taught in the Sunday School in the village of Winshill. He volunteered for the British Army in January 1915, during the opening months of the First World War. He served in The North Staffordshire Regiment (The Prince of Wales's), in the 1/6th Battalion.

Victoria Cross
Lance Corporal Coltman was 26 years old and a stretcher bearer, when the following deed took place in France, for which he was awarded the VC.

Coltman was invested with his Victoria Cross by King George V at Buckingham Palace on 22 May 1919.

Distinguished Conduct Medal
The first award of the Distinguished Conduct Medal (DCM) was made for gallantry over a period of days in July 1917. The citation in The London Gazette reads:

Bar to the DCM
The second award of the DCM was made for conduct in September 1918, only a week before his actions that earned him the VC.  The citation read:

Military Medal
The Military Medal (MM) is gazetted when awarded but no citation is given. Coltman was still a private at the time of this award. The award was made for rescuing a wounded officer from no man's land in February 1917. The officer had been commanding a wiring party during a misty night. The mist cleared and the party found themselves under fire, the officer was wounded in the thigh and Coltman immediately went out to bring the man in.

Bar to the MM
The second award of the MM was gazetted in August 1917. This award was for conduct behind the front lines in June 1917 and covered three separate instances of gallantry in a short period in June 1917.  On 6 June an ammunition dump was hit by mortar fire causing several casualties, Coltman took responsibility for removing Verey lights from the dump. The following day he took a leading role in tending men injured when the company headquarters was mortared.  A little over a week later, a trench tunnel collapsed trapping a number of men.  Coltman organised a rescue party to dig the trapped men out.

Other awards
Prior to any of his decorations Coltman was Mentioned in Despatches for his work.

Later life

After the war, Coltman returned to Burton and took a job as a gardener with the town's Parks Department. During the Second World War he was commissioned in the Army Cadet Force in 1943 and commanded the Burton ACF; he resigned his commission in 1951. He retired in 1963 and died at Outwoods Hospital, Burton, in 1974 at the age of 82. He is buried in the churchyard of St Mark's parish church in Winshill with his wife Eleanor May ( Dolman).

Legacy
His medals, including his Victoria Cross, are on display at the Staffordshire Regiment Museum at Whittington Barracks, Lichfield, Staffordshire. At the museum there is a replica First World War trench named in honour of Coltman.  Coltman House is the headquarters building of Defence Medical Services at Whittington Barracks. The Burton Army Cadet Force base and Army Reserve Centre is at Coltman House, Hawkins Lane, Burton.

There is a monument to Coltman at the Memorial Gardens, Lichfield Street, Burton. The Coltman VC Peace Wood is at Mill Hill Lane, Winshill. In Tunstall a road has been named in honour of Coltman.

References

External links
Film clip of Coltman in February 1963 from the Media Archive for Central England (MACE) 

1891 births
1974 deaths
People from Burton upon Trent
North Staffordshire Regiment soldiers
British World War I recipients of the Victoria Cross
Army Cadet Force officers
Recipients of the Military Medal
Recipients of the Distinguished Conduct Medal
British Army recipients of the Victoria Cross
Military personnel from Staffordshire
Burials in Staffordshire